Les Luthiers is an Argentine comedy-musical group, very popular also in several other Spanish-speaking countries including Paraguay, Guatemala, Peru, Chile, Ecuador, Spain, Colombia, Mexico, Uruguay, Bolivia, Cuba, Costa Rica and Venezuela. They were formed in 1967 by Gerardo Masana, during the height of a period of very intense choral music activity in Argentina's state universities. Their outstanding characteristic is the home-made musical instruments (hence the name luthiers, French for "musical instrument maker"), some of them extremely sophisticated, which they skillfully employ in their recitals to produce music and texts full of high class and refined humor. From 1977 until his death in 2007, they worked with Roberto Fontanarrosa, a renowned Argentine cartoonist and writer.

Musical stylings
Les Luthiers began writing humorous pieces primarily in a Baroque style, especially imitating vocal genres such as cantatas, madrigals and serenatas.  Later, they diversified into humorous renditions of music in other genres, from romantic lieder and opera to pop, mariachi, rock  and even rap.  Their stage show is often intermingled with humorous skits, frequently involving absurd situations, the music and biography of fictional composer Johann Sebastian Mastropiero and a heavy reliance on fairly sophisticated puns and word play.  Much of the humor derives from the basic contradictions between the formality and highly developed vocal and instrumental technique of classical musicians and the sheer silliness of their show. All members of the group provided their voices for the pigeons in the Latin American and Spanish dubbings of the 2008 Disney film, Bolt.

Les Luthiers have acknowledged the influence of Gerard Hoffnung and Peter Schickele in their work. "Professor" Schickele invented in 1965 the fictional character of P.D.Q. Bach, son of Johann Sebastian Bach. He also invented many unusual instruments based on real ones, in the same style of the group. He also used the fictional biography of his imaginary composer as a running gag in his musical act.

Mr. Hoffnung predated both acts, starting in 1956 the Hoffnung Music Festival and publishing many cartoons with imaginary instruments for a classical orchestra. Malcolm Arnold probably was the first person to write a parody of classical music using odd instruments when he wrote for a Hoffnung Concert the score of A Grand, Grand Overture, a piece for orchestra and vacuum cleaners dedicated to US President Herbert Hoover.

Informal instruments
Les Luthiers are known in particular for employing a diverse ensemble of invented instruments created from common, everyday materials.  The group's first home-made musical instrument, the bass-pipe a vara (a sort of trombone), was created by Gerardo Masana, the founder of the group, by joining paperboard tubes found in the garbage and miscellaneous items. Forty years later, this instrument is still being used on stage.

The first informal instruments were relatively simple, like the Gum-Horn, made with a hose, a funnel and a trumpet's mouthpiece, and some of them were born as a parody of musical instruments, which is the case of the latín (referred to in English as fiddlecan) and the violata, bowed instruments whose resonating chambers are made out of a large tin for processed ham and a paint can respectively, the marimba de cocos, a marimba made out of coconuts, and others.

Inventor and instrument-maker Carlos Iraldi (1920–1995), as "Les Luthiers' luthier", was responsible for inventing several more sophisticated instruments, including the mandocleta, a wheel moves the strings of a mandolin, the bajo barríltono, a double bass whose body is a giant barrel, and others.

After Iraldi's death in 1995 Hugo Domínguez took his place, and made instruments such as the desafinaducha, the nomeolbídet etc.

Current members
 Carlos López Puccio: Bowed Strings (violin, viola, cello), synthesizers, piano, vocals, percussion (in some jazz songs), dactilophone, etc.
 Jorge Maronna: Vocals, fretted strings (guitar, bass, banjo, charango, lute, cuatro...), cello, synthesizers, etc.
 Roberto Antier: Vocals
 Tomás Mayer-Wolf: Piano, vocals
 Martin O'Connor: Vocals
 Horacio Turano: Vocals, drums, bass pipe, bass guitar, piano, saxophone

Former members
 Gerardo Masana, founder (died in 1973): Guitar, bass-pipe, vocals, percussion, etc.
 Ernesto Acher (left the group in 1986): Piano, horn, trumpet, clarinet, drums, synthesizers, cello, vocals, etc.
 Daniel Rabinovich (died in 2015): Vocals, guitar, violin, bass-pipe, sousaphone, recorder, drums, etc.
 Carlos Núñez Cortés (left the group in 2017): Piano, vocals, recorder, accordion, piccolo, Bunsen flute, synthesizer, dactilophone, tambourine, washboard, etc.
 Marcos Mundstock: (died in 2020): Vocals, percussion, trumpet, synthesizer, etc.

Shows
Les Luthiers cuentan la ópera (1967)
Todos somos mala gente (1968)
Blancanieves y los siete pecados capitales (1969)
Querida condesa (1969)
Opus pi (1971)
Recital '72 (1972)
Recital sinfónico '72 (1972)
Recital '73 (1973)
Recital '74 (1974)
Recital '75 (1975)
Viejos fracasos (1976)
Mastropiero que nunca (1977)
Les Luthiers hacen muchas gracias de nada (1979)
Los clásicos de Les Luthiers (1980)
Luthierías (1981)
Por humor al arte (1983)
Humor dulce hogar (1985)
Recital sinfónico '86 (1986)
Viegésimo aniversario (1987)
El reír de los Cantares (1989)
Grandes Hitos (1992)
Unen canto con humor (1994)
Bromato de armonio (1996)
Todo por que rías (1999)
¡Do, Re, Mi, Já! (2000)
El Grosso Concerto (2001)
Las obras de ayer (2002)
Con Les Luthiers y sinfónica (2004)
¡Aquí Les Luthiers! (2005)
Los premios Mastropiero (2005)
40 años (2007)
Lutherapia (2008)
¡Chist! (2011)
Viejos hazmerreíres (2014)
Gran reserva (2017)
Más tropiezos de Mastropiero (2022)

Discography
Sonamos Pese A Todo (1971)
Cantata Laxatón (1972)
Les Luthiers (volumen 3) (1973)
Les Luthiers (volumen 4) (1976)
Mastropiero que nunca (1979)
Muchas gracias de nada (1980)
Les Luthiers (volumen 7) (1983)
Cardoso en Gulevandia (1991)
Les Luthiers En Vivos (2007)
Les Luthiers Mas Vivos (2013)

Awards 
 2017 Princess of Asturias Award for Communications and Humanities.
 2011 Latin Grammy Lifetime Achievement Award

External links

Official Site 
 
La página de Les Luthiers de Patrick 
Les Luthiers Chile 
Les Luthiers, Pese a todo 
Les Luthiers y los Jóvenes de Hoy en Día 
Los Luthiers de la Web 

 
Argentine musical groups
Comedy musical groups
Argentine comedy troupes
Musical groups established in 1967
Illustrious Citizens of Buenos Aires
Humor in classical music
Latin Grammy Lifetime Achievement Award winners